is a bus company on Okinawa Island, established on May 18, 2012, and headquartered in Nanjō City. It primarily operates in South and Central Okinawa, and currently operates four bus models. The average cost is ¥220 for adults and ¥110 for children.

See also 
Ryukyu Bus Kotsu

References

External links 
 http://www.toyobus.jp/

Transport in Okinawa Prefecture
Bus companies of Japan